State Road 358 in the U.S. state of Indiana is an east–west state highway in Knox and Daviess counties, covering a distance of about 12 miles.

Route description
State Road 358 starts at State Road 67 near the small town of Edwardsport and runs east to Plainville.  It is then concurrent with State Road 57 and runs northeast for about  before striking east again for the last two miles (3 km) of its length, where it meets State Road 58 south of Elnora.

Major intersections

References

External links

358
Transportation in Daviess County, Indiana
Transportation in Knox County, Indiana